ZT280 Tablet PC is a tablet computer that is created by the Android tablet company Zenithink. The main operating system used on this tablet is Android, with the latest devices being created with Android 4.0 Ice Cream Sandwich. The current latest device is the C91 Upgrade, which features 1024MB RAM with Flash 11.01 compatibility and HDMI connectivity outputs. The tablet includes a media section which includes Music, Gallery, Video and Applications/Widgets.  The apps also include an Office application which allows edits and creation of Word, Powerpoint and Excel files. The tablet also includes preinstalled apps such as Facebook for Android. Another feature of the tablet is that it enables the user to allow tethering of their devices Wireless/Internet connection which includes password protection and edits of the name given to the connection allowing users to personalise their devices connection without having to change settings in any way. Personalization features also include Wallpaper, Applications and Google Play

Android (operating system) devices
Tablet computers